Aposthia is a rare congenital condition in humans, in which the foreskin of the penis is missing.

Toward the end of the nineteenth century, E. S. Talbot claimed that aposthia among Jews was evidence for the now-discredited Lamarckian theory of evolution. In his work The Variation of Animals and Plants Under Domestication, Charles Darwin also  mentioned cases of "born circumcised" babies as "conclusive evidence" for the now-discredited blending inheritance.

It is likely that the cases he described were actually hypospadias, a condition in which the urinary meatus is on the underside of the penis.

Aposthia in Judaism
The Midrash of Ki-Tetze [כי תצא] claims that Moses was born aposthic. Other sources that Jacob, his son Gad and King David were also born aposthic.
The book Abot De-Rabbi Natan (The Fathers According to Rabbi Nathan) contains a list of persons from the Israelite Scriptures that were "born circumcised":
Adam, Seth, Noah, Shem, Jacob, Joseph, Moses, the wicked Balaam, Samuel, David, Jeremiah and Zerubbabel.
Jewish law requires males born without a foreskin or who lost their foreskin through means other than a formal circumcision ceremony (brit milah ברית מילה) to have a drop of blood (hatafat-dam, הטפת דם) let from the penis at the point where the foreskin would have been (or was) attached. The Talmud (Shabbat 135A) records a discussion of whether the importance of this letting of blood supersedes Shabbat, on which only a boy who was born the previous Shabbat can be circumcised. If a regular circumcision is delayed, there is no disagreement that this may not be performed on Shabbat. However, in the case of aposthia, there are two schools of thought.

R. Elazar Hakappar said that the school of Shamai and Hillel do not differ as to a boy that is born without a foreskin. Both agree that the blood of the covenant must be drawn from the glans. The school of Shamai, however, contends that this may be done on the Sabbath, while the other holds that the Sabbath must not be desecrated on that account.

David Levy, former Israeli Foreign Minister and member of Knesset, was born aposthic. Arye Avneri's authorized 1983 biography of Levy notes this:

The rabbis in Rabat proclaimed that this foretold that Levy would grow up to be a "leader of Israel", even though the State was not founded until Levy was 11, in 1948. This proclamation was not necessarily prophetic of the founding of Israel, for "Israel" is a term that can be used to refer to "the Jewish people".

Aposthia in Islam
Some traditions in Islam say Muhammad was born without a foreskin.

Aposthia in literature
Lazarus Long, principal protagonist in several of Robert Heinlein's novels, was born aposthic.

Sources

  Aposthia in Dorland's Medical Dictionary
 Shulchan Aruch, Code of Jewish Law, Yoreh Deah § 263 Law 4 (ש"ע י"ד  ס' רס"ג הל' ד).

External links
 

Congenital disorders of male genital organs
Penis disorders
Rare diseases